The 2011 South American Under-17 Football Championship was the 14th U-17 tournament for national teams affiliated with CONMEBOL. It was held in Ecuador from 12 March to 9 April 2011.

This tournament gave four berths to the 2011 FIFA U-17 World Cup, which was held in Mexico, and also the 2011 Pan American Games in Guadalajara, Mexico. Brazil won their tenth title and their fourth in a row. They qualified to the aforementioned tournaments along with Uruguay, Argentina, and Ecuador.

Teams

 (holders)

 (hosts)

Venues
Five stadiums in five host cities were chosen for the tournament. Due to a scheduling conflict on the final match day, another stadium in Quito was added and used in the tournament.

Officials
On 8 February 2011, CONMEBOL's Commission on Referees announced the list of 10 referees and assistant to be used for the tournament.

Officials
 Néstor Pitana
 José Jordán
 Ricardo Marques
 Patricio Polic
 Héctor Parra
 Diego Lara
 Julio Quintana
 Henry Gambetta
 Héctor Martínez
 Mayker Gómez

Assistants
 Alejo Castany
 Javier Bustillos
 Marcio Santiago
 Juan Maturana
 Wilmar Navarro
 Byron Romero
 Carlos Cáceres
 Jorge Yupanqui
 Carlos Changala
 Jairo Romero

Squads

Each national team had to present a list of twenty players by 2 March 2011, but each association had the ability to change five players up to five days before the start of the tournament. All the players had to be born after 1 January 1994.

First stage

When teams finish level of points, the final order determined according to:
 superior goal difference in all matches
 greater number of goals scored in all group matches
 better result in matches between tied teams
 drawing of lots

All match times are in local Ecuadorian time (UTC−05:00).

Group A

The game was suspended in the 2nd half due to a blackout with Argentina leading 2–0, and was completed on 22 March.

Group B

Final stage

Goalscorers

6 goals
 Juan Cruz Mascia

5 goals
 Mauro Caballero

4 goals
 Federico Andrada
 Robert Royer Silva
 Leo
 Fabián Cuero
 Cristian Garcés

3 goals
 Leandro Paredes
 Lucas Pugh
 Adryan
 Lucas Piazon
 Matheus Barbosa
 Ángelo Henríquez
 Luis Batioja
 José Francisco Cevallos
 Édison Flores
 Andy Polo

2 goals
 Martín Benítez
 Lucas Ocampos
 Cláudio Winck
 Emerson
 Guilherme
 Pedro Paulo
 Junior Sornoza
 Carlos Florenciáñez
 Juan San Martín
 Manuel Arteaga

1 goal
 Ezequiel Báez
 Brian Ferreira
 Marcos Pinto
 Luis Fernando Banegas
 Marlon Bica
 Misael
 Gerrado Navarrete
 Ariel Páez
 Ricardo Delgado
 Pedro Osorio
 Cristian Palomeque
 Yuldor Villadiego

1 goal (cont.)
 Kevin Mercado
 Jonny Uchuari
 Rodrigo Báez
 Alan Benítez
 Christian Giménez
 Derlis González
 Miller Mareco
 Sebastián Olevar
 Christian Palacios
 Horacio Benincasa
 Raziel García
 Elbio Álvarez
 Rodrigo Aguirre
 Gastón Silva
 Édson Castillo
 Alejandro González
 Víctor García

Own goals
 Maximiliano Padilla (playing against Uruguay)

See also
2011 FIFA U-17 World Cup
Football at the 2011 Pan American Games- Men's tournament

References

External links
Official website 
Official regulations 
Match schedule 

2011 in Ecuadorian football
2011
South American Under-17 Football Championship
2011 South American Under-17 Football Championship
Qualification tournaments for the 2011 Pan American Games
2011 in youth association football